Jeethu Joseph (born 10 November 1972) is an Indian film director, screenwriter, and producer who predominantly works in Malayalam cinema. He has also worked in a few Tamil, Telugu and Hindi films. Jeethu made his directional debut with the 2007 police procedural, Detective. He is best known for the crime thrillers, Drishyam and Drishyam 2. Drishyam became the highest-grossing Malayalam film ever, at its time of release. It was the first Malayalam film to cross the 50 crore mark, at the box office. Drishyam 2 was released directly through Amazon Prime Video, due to the COVID-19 pandemic. Like the prequel, it was highly acclaimed and appreciated, worldwide.

His other works include Mummy & Me (2010), My Boss (2012), Life of Josutty (2015), Memories (2013), Oozham (2016), Aadhi (2018). Jeethu made his Tamil debut with Papanasam (2015) which is a remake of his 2014 film Drishyam, Hindi debut with The Body (2019), and Telugu debut with Drushyam 2 (2021).

Early life
Jeethu was born in a Syro-Malabar Catholic family in Mutholapuram, Muvattupuzha taluk to Leelamma and V. Joseph, ex-MLA of Muvattupuzha. Jeethu wanted to attend the Film and Television Institute of India (FTII) although his father wanted him to become an engineer. He attended Fathima Matha English Medium School and later graduated with a bachelor's degree in economics from Nirmala College, Muvattupuzha.

Career

Early works
Jeethu Joseph started as an assistant director to Jayaraj in the film Bheebhathsam. After that, he got a chance to direct a film starring Dileep but it did not materialize and he was back where he started. Meanwhile, Jeethu developed the one-line plot of Detective. But after failing to find any producers, his mother Leelamma Joseph offered to co-produce the film, which became his debut directorial. A month into the project, a producer evinced interest and took on the production. Detective was released in 2007. The film fared well at the box-office.

His next film Mummy & Me was a success at the box-office. Mummy and Me, although it took close to three years in the making, marked a turning point in his career as director. "My first film was easy compared to the struggle I had to go through for my second, Mummy and Me." There were offers to make films like Detective, but Jeethu declined. "I wanted to do a different film" It was for this reason that, though he had one line scripts of Mummy and Me and Memories ready in 2008, he chose to make Mummy and Me.

His third film My Boss was also a success in theatres. Jeethu's fourth movie Memories, a suspense thriller, was released in 2013 which did well in box office.

Post Drishyam 
Towards the end of 2013, the drama-thriller Drishyam starring Mohanlal was released, which was well received critically and commercially. It was the highest-grossing Malayalam film, until 2016, and the first Malayalam film to cross 50 crore mark at the box office. Drishyam was remade in Tamil by Jeethu with Kamal Haasan enacting Mohanlal's role. It was also remade to Telugu, Kannada and Hindi by other directors. Jeethu then directed Dileep-starrer Life of Josutty.

Personal life
Jeethu married Linta and they have two children. Linta is a costume designer in Malayalam cinema.

Filmography

Awards
 2013 – 44th Kerala State Film Awards - Best Popular Film - Drishyam
 2013 – Vanitha Film Awards – Best Director – Drishyam
 2013 – Kerala Film Critics Association Awards – Best Director – Drishyam
 2013 – Jaihind TV Film Awards – Best Director – Drishyam
 2013 - South Indian International Movie Awards - Best Director - Drishyam

References

External links
 

Malayalam film directors
Malayali people
Living people
Malayalam screenwriters
1972 births
Kannada screenwriters
People from Muvattupuzha
Tamil screenwriters
Telugu screenwriters
Film directors from Kochi
21st-century Indian film directors
21st-century Indian dramatists and playwrights
Screenwriters from Kochi
21st-century Indian screenwriters
Telugu film directors